Bargon Attack is an adventure game, originally released in Spain and France in 1992. The cyberpunk game uses stylized art presented in a 2.5D format.

Plot
Adventuregames.com describes the plot:

Gameplay
Mr Bill's Adventure Land describes the gameplay:

Development
Bargon Attack is an adaption of a French cartoon of the same name by Racheed & Marc Brothers, published in 1989 and 1991 in Micro News. It is one of the less known Coktel Vision games, and was one of the first to use a new interface that was copied for many later titles from the company. It was one of the first to use FMV technology in cut-scenes. Two versions of the game have been published on PC: 16 & 256 colors. In the latter, the intro is voiced without subtitles.

Reception
Joystick (French) rated the game 94 out of 100, Génération 4 rated it 80%, Joker Verlag präsentiert: Sonderheft rated it 78%, Gamezone (Germany) rated it 60%, and Power Play rated it 59%.

Retrospective reviews
Home of the Underdogs said "Bargon Attack is a fun, campy adventure that would probably appeal to Coktel fans more than anyone else. The game's longer-than-average length and some hunt-the-pixel puzzles also makes for many hair-pulling sessions where you desperately try every inventory object with everything on the screen." Obligement wrote "In short, no more haggling, Bargon Attack is an average game with a gameplay view and review, graphics somewhat limits and a soundtrack that has probably been forgotten on a bench by a November evening, but it is partially saved with its down-home style, and its totally abstract concept "game adapted from a comic magazine". Try it, you do not risk anything, it's French." The book Science Fiction Video Games by Neal Roger Tringham deemed the game "largely incomprehensible".

Abandondonia wrote "In the end, this game deserved to be forgotten by history. This is Coktel’s Pandora's Box, with nearly every sin an adventure game can make all rolled into this one game. You should get stuck because of tough puzzles, not because of demented design decisions, which you'll drown in when playing this game. Bottom line: avoid this game unless you want to see exactly what adventure games shouldn't do." Mr. Bill's Adventureland said "I personally recommend this game fairly well. It is good fun, the graphics are well done, the story is the usual save-the-earth basic scenario, the puzzles and connections are very logical (except where the unavailable manual is required or the walkthrough), and it is very satisfying to play when you solve a tricky puzzle or situation. Try to play it without the walkthrough, but you will definitely need to resort to the walkthrough at a few points. Bargon Attack is an interesting and attention holding game that I am sure many people will enjoy and some people will hate."

References

External links
 Bargon Attack in 1992 Amiga Joker article
 3 reviews from Amiga Joker 11/92, Power Play 8/92, and Power Play 11/92 
 Review in Joystick (France)

1992 video games
Adventure games
Amiga games
Atari ST games
DOS games
Video games about extraterrestrial life
Coktel Vision games
ScummVM-supported games
Video games developed in France